The Men's Downhill competition of the Vancouver 2010 Olympics was held at Whistler Creekside in Whistler, British Columbia. The competition was scheduled for Saturday, February 13, but was postponed due to rain and warm temperatures; it was held on Monday, February 15.

The defending Olympic champion was Antoine Dénériaz of France and the reigning world champion was John Kucera of Canada; neither competed as Dénériaz had retired and Kucera was out for the season with a broken leg. Austrian Michael Walchhofer was the defending World Cup downhill champion and Didier Cuche of Switzerland led the current season, ahead of teammate Carlo Janka and Walchhofer.

Switzerland's Didier Défago won the gold medal, Aksel Lund Svindal of Norway took the silver, and the bronze medalist was Bode Miller of the United States; Cuche was sixth, Walchhofer tenth, and Janka eleventh.

This was the seventeenth edition of the men's downhill at the Olympics and the time margins between the medalists were the closest in history; only 0.09 seconds separated gold and bronze.

Results
The race was started at 10:30 local time, (UTC −8).

References

External links
2010 Winter Olympics results: Men's Downhill, from https://web.archive.org/web/20091025194336/http://www.vancouver2010.com/; retrieved 2010-02-15.
FIS results
Ski Racing.com - Defago Gets Downhill Gold, Bode Bronze - 2010-02-15

Downhill
Winter Olympics